Comptrollers of Army Accounts were British public officials first appointed on 10 June 1703, by the Lord High Treasurer, Lord Godolphin; there were two Comptrollers (assisted by a Secretary and eight clerks). Initially under the authority of the Commander-in-Chief, they were instead made accountable to the Treasury in 1708.

Role
The Comptrollers were established to audit the accounts of all army Paymasters and regiments, to keep an account of all weapons, tents and provisions issued to each regiment (to ensure that each regiment was duly charged for what it received) and to inspect all muster rolls. To begin with, they also had responsibility for inspecting the clothing contracts entered into by each regiment but in 1708 this duty was handed over to a separate Clothing Board established under the Board of General Officers.

In 1783 the role of the Comptrollers was extended, to cover 'the examination of the Provision and Store accounts of the Commissariat Department'.

In 1785 the two Comptrollers of Army Accounts were made ex officio members of the new Audit Board (the Commissioners for Auditing Public Accounts). In 1806 the Comptrollers were separated from the Audit Board; their responsibilities and powers were again extended and a third Comptroller was appointed (however, when he died in office in 1830, he was not replaced). By 1833 they were described as: "Comptrollers of all extraordinary military expenditure (except that connected with the Ordnance department) and auditors of the provision and store accounts of all Commissariat and other officers in charge of stores (except ordnance) on foreign service".

Demise
In 1835 the office of the Comptrollers of Army Accounts was dissolved and its responsibilities given to the Commissioners of Audit.

List of Comptrollers

References

British Army
HM Treasury
1703 establishments in England
1835 disestablishments in the United Kingdom